Drumming (also called bleating or winnowing) is a sound produced by snipe as part of their courtship display flights. The sound is produced mechanically (rather than vocally) by the vibration of the outer tail feathers when flying in a downwards, swooping motion. The drumming display is usually crepuscular, though it can also be heard at any point throughout the breeding season, as well as sporadically during their migration period. Drumming is commonly heard within the context of a mating display, but it can also be displayed as means of distraction when conspecific intruders or potential predators are in the area — this can benefit male snipe in attracting a female mate. The weather can also have an impact on the acoustic properties of drumming — more humid weather will not allow the sound to carry as far and will create a deeper tone.

In looking at drumming in the different types of snipe, the category of what is often referred to as true snipe (Capella gallinago) is the most widely researched. This category of snipe comprises nine species, however, the two snipe that are the most prominent of this group are the common snipe (Gallinago gallinago) and the Wilson's snipe (Gallinago delicata). Despite being quite similar in their appearance, the common snipe and the Wilson's snipe have several morphological differences that allow for there to be differences in their drumming behaviour. The most noted difference being that the Wilson's snipe has more rectrices compared to the common snipe.

When the discovery was made that this mysterious drumming sound was produced by snipe, there were many naturalists that wanted to learn how the sound was actually being produced — this led to a number of experimental studies. The first of many was conducted in the year 1830 by a German scientist Johann Friedrich Naumann who proposed that the sound was being produced by the wings. A few years later after reading Naumann's proposal, the scientist Friedrich Wilhelm Meves conducted studies that looked in-depth at the tail-feathers of snipe. It was eventually confirmed through Meve's experiments that the drumming sound was produced by the tail-feathers.

Before the confirmed discovery of the drumming behaviour in snipe, there were many theories and folklore surrounding where the sound was actually coming from. The Nunamiut people of Alaska believed that the drumming of the Wilson's snipe resembled the sound of a walrus, and therefore they referred to the snipe as avikiak for walrus. Another example can be seen in the popular belief of some parts of Sweden where they thought the sound was from a horse that had been miraculously transported into the sky because they thought the sound was so similar to that of a horse's whinny. Others from Northern Germany likened the drumming sound to that made from goats.

Function 
The drumming sound produced by snipe is commonly heard within the context of a mating display, though that is not always the case. These display flights are performed by both sexes in threat contexts as well and appear to be antagonistic in their action, even when directed by males to females. The display flight, sometimes referred to as a winnowing flight, is used in diving at conspecific intruders and potential predators, with the male at times attacking in flight — a clear demonstration of antagonism but can also function to attract females.

Performance context 
Though snipe drum at any point throughout the breeding season, and sporadically during migration periods, the maximum drumming period is during the twilight hours of the evening and morning. Very rarely are snipe heard drumming before dawn, or for as many minutes, after sunset. In looking at the various contexts in which drumming is performed, the most common can be seen in territorial displays. Like during the migration periods, drumming as a territorial display occurs sporadically at any point in the year, though it is most intense on the breeding grounds. These displays are mainly performed by male snipe and they can be distinguished by their frayed middle tail-feathers. Drumming can also be performed in a sexual display over home range. If a snipe is disturbed by a suspected intruder, then they may start drumming as a way to distract the potential threat. This context of drumming can be seen in both male and female snipe during the early part of the breeding season.

Weather 
Depending on weather conditions as well, the acoustic properties of drumming in snipe can vary. For example, if the weather is humid then the drumming sound will not carry as far and the tone will actually be deeper. Weather conditions such as wind, rain or dense fog can also have an effect on the quality of drumming that is produced. In the province of Newfoundland, there is usually a rapid drop in temperature after sunset and a fast rise in temperature after sunrise and this can also effect drumming.

Mechanics 
It was once believed that the drumming sound was produced by the vocal organs, though it has since been confirmed that is not the case. The specifics of how this extraordinary sound is produced can be explained by looking at the tail feathers. The sound is generated by vibration of the outer rectrices in the airstream modified by the set of wings. Drumming in G. galinaga and G. delicata begins quite soft, increasing in volume and frequency as the dive progresses—reaching a crescendo just before the dive concludes. Each drum is several seconds in length and is full of rich harmonies.

In looking at the aerodynamics of drumming, the two outer tail-feathers of the snipe, when widely expanded, can actually vibrate without interference from the outer rectrices. Because the outer tail-feathers are somewhat elastic, they are able to bend about their shafts under air pressure. In bending this way, along with the twisting of the outer tail-feathers, the length of the vibration is continuous as long as the required air speed is maintained.

To make sure the feathers are able to withstand the strain of the vibrations, they are very strong in their structure. There have been differences noted between both the outer and inner tail-feathers of the snipe to help better explain the aerodynamic mechanisms that are responsible for its sound production. The outer tail-feathers for example are stronger and much more stiff compared to the inner tail-feathers and they have strong hooks which join the barbules of the rear vane in order to prevent it from breaking at high wind speeds. To ensure that the vibrations occur within a safe limit, the wings of the snipe are used. The quivering of the wings interrupts the flow of air to the tail-feathers during a dive and actually decreases the vibration, which is what allows for the shaky and tremulous quality of the drumming sound.

Types of snipe 

There is an extensive list of the snipe and snipe-like birds, and they can be separated into three main groups: semi-snipes, aberrant snipes, and true snipes. For the purpose of this section, the group of the true snipes will be examined. The true snipes comprise nine species, all of which are quite similar to one another, however, they differ mainly in terms of both the size and number of their outer tail-feathers. The most widely researched of the true snipe are the common snipe and the Wilson's snipe, and the drumming differences between these two species of snipe will be discussed here.

Wilson's snipe 
The Wilson's snipe (Gallinago delicata) was historically considered to be both a subspecies of the common snipe and also distinct from them, however, the differences in their drumming display and morphology have, in recent years, allowed for the Wilson snipe to be classified as having its own specific status. They are medium in size, with a total length of 28 cm (280 mm) and 100 g in mass. Some characteristic traits of their appearance include having a black-striped crown, light-coloured spots that form 4 lines running down their back, and a russet tail.

Common snipe 
The common snipe (Gallinago gallinago) is regarded as one of the most successful snipe, and can be found in every continent apart from Australia and Antarctica. They range from around 225 to 300 mm in length and some characteristic traits of their appearance include having horizontal ochre stripes along their back, dark stripes on top of their head, and light underparts which disrupts their plumage and breaks up their shape when they are resting.

Differences 

In order to understand why there are differences in the drumming behaviour of the Wilson's snipe compared to the common snipe (Gallinago gallinago), their morphological differences must first be explained. Despite being very similar to the common snipe, there are some morphological differences to note in terms of the Wilson's snipe that includes how they typically have more rectrices (16 vs. 14); their outer rectrices are ≤ 9 mm wide with narrower and more distinct barring. As well, the outer rectrices of the Wilson's snipe are shorter and more narrow than those of the common snipe which contributes to differences in their drumming. Another difference that has been noted is that the tail of the Wilson's snipe extends well beyond its wing-tips. In looking at the drumming difference between the two snipe, the drumming of the common snipe is lower in frequency and modulation rate compared to the Wilson's snipe. The fundamental frequency for G. gallinago is 350–400 Hz with a strong emphasis on odd harmonics, whereas for G. delicata the fundamental frequency is twice as high and its energy falls off with frequency. As well, the drumming of the common snipe has been likened to the sound of a goat or sheep, while the drumming of the Wilson's snipe is pure tremolo.

Experimental discoveries 

Since learning of the drumming sound that is produced by snipe, many naturalists wanted to try and explain exactly how the sound is made. Johann Friedrich Naumann was one of the many scientists interested in this task and he proposed that the drumming sound was mechanically produced by the wings. Naumann proposed this idea around 1830, and it then became known as Naumann's Wing Theory. It was not until 1846 that an error was discovered within Naumann's theory proposal, having written schwanzfederspitsen (the German word for the tips of the tail feather) as schwingfederspitsen (which roughly translates to wing feathers). This misprint led to Friedrich Wilhelm Meves to study in-depth the effects of the tail-feathers. To do this, Meves attached the tail-feathers to the end of a long stick and swung both the stick and the feathers through the air, which eventually led to him concluding that the tail-feathers were in fact the producing-agents for the drumming sound. In conducting this experiment, Meves observed that the drumming sound was only ever produced when the bird was flying in a downwards, swooping motion with its tail spread out — never when the bird was flying upwards.

Throughout many years of testing various experiments in order to explain exactly how the mechanics of the drumming sound of snipe is produced, Arnold B. Erickson made the concluding statement in 1953 that affirms that the sound is "produced primarily by air vibrating the still outer tail-feathers as the bird spreads them while going into a power dive. The tremulous quality of the sound is an effect of the slow quivering of the wings superimposed on the more rapid vibrations of the tail-feathers".

Folklore 

Before the mechanics were scientifically confirmed, there were many folk explanations about where this mysterious sound was coming from. In looking at the drumming of the Wilson's snipe, the Nunamiut people of Alaska would refer to the snipe as an avikiak or walrus because they believed that their drumming resembled the blowing sound made by walrus. As well, for the common snipe it was of popular belief in parts of Sweden that the snipe was actually a horse that had been miraculously transported into the sky because their drumming sounded so similar to the whinny of a horse. In parts of Northern Germany it was believed that the drumming or bleating of the common snipe at twilight was made by Donar's goats as they pulled his chariot across the heavens — referring to the similarity of their drumming to the call of a goat. As well, in areas of Newfoundland, fishermen have associated the drum of Wilson's snipe with the arrival of lobsters inshore: "when the snipe bawls, the lobster crawls".

References

Sandpipers
Coenocorypha
Gallinago
Bird sonation
Scolopax
Bird behavior